Advanced Compatibility Engineering (commonly called ACE Body Structure) is the marketing name given to an automobile body structure design by Honda. It claims to distribute collision energy evenly and redirect it away from the passenger compartment, while at the same time, minimizing damage to other impacted vehicles. This is accomplished by using numerous grades of steel (typically four) which crumple in key areas and remain rigid in others.  It is standard on all Honda and Acura models as of 2016.

Vehicles equipped with the ACE body structure
 2017–present Honda WR-V
 2016–present Honda BR-V
 2014–present Honda Mobilio
 2013–present Honda Amaze
 2013–present Honda Brio
 2009–present Honda Fit
 2006–present Honda Civic
 2008–present Honda Accord
 2017–present Honda Clarity
 Honda CR-Z, since introduction
 2010–present Honda Insight
 2007–present Honda CR-V
 2010–present Honda Crosstour
 2009–present Honda Pilot
 2005–present Honda Odyssey
 2017–present Honda Ridgeline
 Acura ILX, since introduction
 2009–2014 Acura TSX
 2009–2014 Acura TL
 2005–2012 Acura RL
 Acura RDX, since introduction
 2007–present Acura MDX
 Acura ZDX, since introduction
 Acura TLX, since introduction 
 2016—present Honda HR-V

References

 OUR COLLISION-FREE FUTURE, Honda official info

Honda